Richard Rogers (1933–2021) was a British architect.

Richard Rogers may also refer to:
Richard Rogers (bishop) (1532/33–1597), British religious leader
Richard Birdsall Rogers (1857–1927), Canadian civil & mechanical engineer
Richard Reid Rogers (1867–1949), American jurist & military governor of Panama Canal Zone
Richard Dean Rogers (1921–2016), American jurist and politician in the Kansas state legislature
Richard Rogers (psychologist) (born 1950), American psychologist & academic
Richard Rogers (sound engineer), American sound engineer
Richard Rogers (died 1643) (c. 1611–1643), English soldier who sat in the House of Commons from 1640 to 1642
Richard Rogers (theologian) (1550–1618), English nonconformist clergyman
Dick Rogers (1912–1970), American jazz musician, composer, comedian
Richard Saltonstall Rogers (1790–1873), East Indies merchant & Salem politician
Richard Sanders Rogers (1861–1942), Australian medical doctor and authority on Australasian orchids
Richard Rogers (serial killer) (born 1950), American serial killer

See also 
Rick Rogers (born 1963), American college football player
Richard Rodgers (disambiguation)